Zaniówka  is a village in the administrative district of Gmina Parczew, within Parczew County, Lublin Voivodeship, in eastern Poland.

Recent Discoveries 
In March 2023, a treasure hoard weighing 3 kg was uncovered in a ceramic jar which contains 1,000 crowns and Lithuanian schillings from the 17th century.

References

Villages in Parczew County